Damir Muminovic (born 13 May 1990) is a professional footballer who plays as a defender for Icelandic club Breiðablik. Born in Serbia, he plays for the Iceland national team.

Club career 

Having moved to Iceland aged 10, he started his career with HK in Kópavogur where he had been playing youth football since coming to Iceland. During his time with HK he also had loan spells in the lower tiers with HK's B side Ýmir and with Hvöt Blönduós.

He switched to Leiknir Reykjavík before the 2012 season and then to Úrvalsdeild club Víkingur Ólafsvík before the 2013 season. Before the 2014 season he switched to Úrvalsdeild club Breiðablik, HK's rival Kópavogur club, where he has established himself in the side.

International career 
He made his debut with the national team in the friendly match against South Korea on 15 January 2022, playing the full 90 minutes.

References

External links

Damir Muminovic - UEFA

1990 births
Living people
Damir Muminovic
Damir Muminovic
Serbian footballers
Damir Muminovic
Naturalised citizens of Iceland
Damir Muminovic
Association football defenders
People from Zaječar